The monotypic genus Anemopsis has only one species, Anemopsis californica, with the common names yerba mansa or lizard tail.

It is a perennial herb in the lizard tail family (Saururaceae) and prefers very wet soil or shallow water.

Range and habitat
It is native to southwestern North America in northwest Mexico and the Southwestern United States from California to Oklahoma and Texas to Kansas to Oregon. It grows in wet, alkaline marsh and creek edges.

Description

Leaves and stems
As it matures, the visible part of the plant develops red stains, eventually turning bright red in the fall.

Inflorescence and fruit
Yerba mansa is showy in spring when in bloom. The iconic white "flowers" (actually reduced inflorescences, or pseudanthia) are borne in early spring, and are surrounded by 4–9 large white bracts.

Similar to the family Asteraceae, what appears to be a single bloom is in reality a dense cluster of individually small flowers borne in an inflorescence.  In this species the inflorescence is conical and has five to ten large white bracts beneath it, so that along with the tiny white florets, the whole structure is quite striking when it blooms in spring.  The conical structure develops into a single, tough fruit that can be carried downstream to spread the tiny, pepper-like seeds.

Common name
In her book on herbs of the southwestern USA, Dr. Soule discusses the common name. "Yerba mansa is one of those names which confounds linguists. Yerba is Spanish for herb, and thus one would think that mansa is also from Spanish as well, but all indications point to the fact that it is not. Mansa means tame, peaceful, calm in Spanish, and the plant has no sedative effect, nor did local people ever use it as a calming agent. Its primary use is as an antimicrobial, antibacterial, and antifungal. The most likely explanation is that mansa is a Spanish alteration of the original native word for the plant, now lost in the depths of time." It is also known as yerba del manso in northern Baja California. The word "manso" could be short for "remanso" (backwater) which would agree with the areas where the plant thrives.

Uses

Medicinal
Yerba mansa is used as an antimicrobial, an antibacterial, and to treat vaginal candidiasis.

Yerba mansa is used to treat inflammation of the mucous membranes, swollen gums and sore throat.  An infusion of roots can be taken as a diuretic to treat rheumatic diseases like gout by ridding the body of excess uric acid, which causes painful inflammation of the joints. Yerba mansa prevents the buildup of uric acid crystals in the kidneys which could cause kidney stones if left untreated. A powder of dried root can be sprinkled on infected areas to alleviate athlete's foot or diaper rash.

Yerba mansa is versatile, it can be taken orally as a tea, tincture, infusion or dried in capsule form. It can be used externally for soaking inflamed or infected areas. It can be ground and used as a dusting powder. Some people in Las Cruces, New Mexico use the leaves to make a poultice to relieve muscle swelling and inflammation. The leaves and roots have also been used to heal and disinfect wounds and sores.

Crafts
 Dried floral structures are used in dried arrangements.  
 Dried plant parts (leaves, floral structure) emit a spicy fragrance and are used in potpourri.

Horticulture
 In the deserts of California, yerba mansa is being used as turf in public parks and ground cover in gardens.

References

External links

Plants For A Future database
Medicinal plants
Jepson Manual Treatment
USDA Plants Profile
Medicinal Uses and Harvesting

Piperales genera
Monotypic magnoliid genera
Flora of California
Flora of Oregon
Flora of Arizona
Flora of Texas
Flora of Colorado
Flora of Utah
Flora of Kansas
Flora of Oklahoma
Flora of Baja California
Flora of Sonora
Flora of Chihuahua (state)
Flora of the California desert regions
Natural history of the Mojave Desert
Natural history of the California Coast Ranges
Natural history of the Central Valley (California)
Garden plants of North America
Drought-tolerant plants
Saururaceae
Flora without expected TNC conservation status